Bernadette Quigley is an American television, film, stage and voice-over actress. She is known for her recurring role of the Chaplain in Mr. Robot (Season 2) and numerous guest-star appearances on shows such as The Blacklist, Law & Order, and Chicago Justice.

Career
In 1996 Quigley made her major motion picture debut opposite Meryl Streep in a small role in Before and After, directed by Barbet Schroeder. Prior to and after 1996, Quigley played many leading roles in the theatre in New York City and throughout the United States, including a national tour in 1992 of Brian Friel’s Dancing at Lughnasa, after understudying the Tony Award-winning play on Broadway. Alvin Klein/New York Times wrote "the individual performances are strikingly good, with Ms. Quigley evincing an uncontainable rapture." Off-Broadway she originated the roles of Jane in Linda Faigao-Hall's Dying in Boulder at La Mama and Aviva in Staci Swedeen’s The Goldman Project (Abingdon Theatre). John Simon/New York Magazine singled out her performance in Kenneth Branagh’s Public Enemy at the Irish Arts Center as "outstanding."

Quigley’s range of roles in regional theaters include Lady Bird Johnson in Robert Schenkkan’s All the Way, Agnes in Tracy Letts’ Bug (Repertory Theatre of St. Louis), the title role in Martin McDonagh's The Beauty Queen of Leenane (opposite Eileen Brennan at Virginia Stage),  and Elizabeth Proctor in Arthur Miller's The Crucible (Repertory Theatre of St. Louis and Cincinnati Playhouse).

Quigley has also played supporting characters in feature films such as The Garden Left Behind directed by Flavio Alves, Olivia Peace's Tahara, Heidi Philipsen & Jon Russell Cring's Darcy, Stuart Connelly's The Suspect, and Jim Sheridan's Oscar-nominated In America.

Bernadette has recorded a number of audiobooks, including Helen Fielding's Cause Celeb. Publishers Weekly wrote: "Quigley scrupulously brings Fielding's vapid, iconic characters to life with her uncanny ability to switch between accents and mood at the drop of a hat, achieving a subtler style of comedy than listeners may expect."

Personal life
Quigley was born in Coldspring, New York and was raised in Peekskill, New York.  She is one of eight children. Her mother, Simonne Quigley (née Lanowitz) emigrated to America from France after World War II and her dad, Robert Quigley was Irish-American from the Bronx. Both her parents were strong civil rights activists. After her mother's death at 99 years of age, in an article for Boston.com, Bernadette "recalled being struck by her parents’ convictions and the lessons they taught their children — to stand up against “racism and hypocrisy.”". Quigley has been married to songwriter Don Rosler since 1991.

Filmography

Film

Television

References

External links 
 

Living people
20th-century American actresses
Actresses from New York (state)
American film actresses
American stage actresses
American television actresses
People from Cold Spring, New York
Year of birth missing (living people)